In Chinese Buddhism, Zhu Zixing is described as the first Chinese to be ordained and become a Buddhist monk via contact with others on the Silk Road. Zhu first went to central Asia in 260 to investigate Buddhism, long before other Chinese monks and travelers reached India to study Buddhism.

3rd-century Buddhists
203 births
282 deaths
Chinese spiritual writers
Cao Wei writers
Cao Wei Buddhists
Writers from Henan